, was a Japanese samurai of the late Edo period. A senior retainer of the Sendai domain. Kagemitsu was the fourteenth Katakura Kojūrō. Served the Meiji government in the reclamation of Hokkaidō. Kagemitsu became a baron in the new kazoku 
system.

Family
Father: Katakura Kagenori
Wife: Akagi Takeko
daughter: Mitsuko married Katakura Kenkichi

External links
Katakura family tree (in Japanese)

Kazoku
Meiji Restoration
Samurai
Katakura clan
Date retainers